This is a list of places on the Victorian Heritage Register in the Shire of Wellington in Victoria, Australia. The Victorian Heritage Register is maintained by the Heritage Council of Victoria.

The Victorian Heritage Register, as of 2021, lists the following thirty state-registered places within the Shire of Wellington:

References

Wellington
+